William Joseph Jackson (born May 7, 1950) is a former professional football player. He played for the New York Jets and Minnesota Vikings as a defensive end. He finished second in quarterback sacks as a rookie. He is currently an evangelist to athletes and conference speaker to Christian men's groups throughout the United States. He also played in the World Football League and Canadian Football League.

He attended and played for the New Mexico State University and was also elected to the New Mexico State University hall of fame. He was later picked in the 5th round of the 1972 NFL Draft by the New York Jets. He was in the Superstar Sports Magazine all rookie team.

References

External links
Just Sports Stats

1950 births
Living people
African-American players of American football
African-American players of Canadian football
American evangelists
American football defensive linemen
Canadian football linebackers
Charlotte Hornets (WFL) players
Edmonton Elks players
Jacksonville Express players
Minnesota Vikings players
New Mexico State Aggies football players
New York Jets players
New York Stars players
Players of American football from Cincinnati
Players of Canadian football from Cincinnati
21st-century African-American people
20th-century African-American sportspeople